Racine is a municipality in Quebec, Canada. It is located in the Le Val-Saint-François Regional County Municipality, in the administrative region of Estrie. It is named after Antoine Racine, the first Bishop of Sherbrooke.

Demographics

Population

Language
Mother tongue (2011)

See also
List of municipalities in Quebec

References

Municipalities in Quebec
Incorporated places in Estrie